Alvin Chester Randolph (born July 8, 1944) is a former safety in the NFL. He was drafted by the San Francisco 49ers in the 3rd round of the 1966 NFL Draft. He also played for the Green Bay Packers, Detroit Lions, Minnesota Vikings, and the Buffalo Bills.  Randolph played college football at the University of Iowa.

References

1944 births
Living people
American football safeties
San Francisco 49ers players
Green Bay Packers players
Detroit Lions players
Minnesota Vikings players
Buffalo Bills players
Iowa Hawkeyes football players
Players of American football from Illinois
Sportspeople from East St. Louis, Illinois